Kobi Farag (born ) is an Israeli actor and filmmaker.

Early life 
Farag was born and raised in Petah Tikva, Israel, to a Sephardic Jewish family from Iraq, who are known as photographers.

Career 
Farag started his career in the Israel Defense Forces Theatre, as part of an ensemble with Ilan Rozenfeld and Oded Paz. They were his co-creators of the cult series HaPijamot, a sitcom about a struggling band.

He appeared in television series, sketch-comedy shows and feature films.

He is an actor for the Cameri Theater of Tel Aviv and hosts a weekly radio program at the Israeli Defense Force radio beginning in 2012.

In 2016, his debut documentary film about his family Photo Farag Film premiered at the Jerusalem Film Festival

References 
Photo Farag Film on Jerusalem Film Festival Official website

External links 
 
 Kobi Farag on Facebook

1980 births
Living people
People from Petah Tikva
Male actors from Tel Aviv
Film people from Tel Aviv
Israeli male film actors
Israeli male television actors
Israeli male stage actors
Israeli film directors
Israeli people of Iraqi-Jewish descent
Israeli Sephardi Jews
Israeli Mizrahi Jews